Melaleuca ferruginea is a plant in the myrtle family, Myrtaceae and is endemic to areas near the coast of the Northern Territory in Australia. It grows to tree size, its new bark is reddish-brown and papery, and its flowers are arranged in spikes new the ends of its branches.

Description
Its younger branches are densely covered with soft, silky hairs but become glabrous later. They are linear to sickle-shaped with the end tapering to a point, and they have 5 to 7 parallel veins.

The petals are more or less circular,  in diameter and the stamens are arranged around each flower in five bundles, each containing 5 to 7 stamens.

Taxonomy and naming
Melaleuca ferruginea was first formally described in 2011 by Lyndley Craven and Ian Cowie in Blumea. The specific epithet (ferruginea) is derived from the Latin ferrugineus meaning "rusty, light reddish brown", referring to the colour of the new bark.

Distribution and habitat
Melaleuca ferruginea occurs near the coast of the Top End of the Northern Territory usually in places that are regularly flooded such as the margins of billabongs and watercourses.

References

ferruginea
Myrtales of Australia
Flora of the Northern Territory
Plants described in 2011
Taxa named by Lyndley Craven